"Never was so much owed by so many to so few" was a wartime speech delivered to the House of Commons of the United Kingdom by British prime minister Winston Churchill on 20 August 1940. The name stems from the specific line in the speech, "Never in the field of human conflict was so much owed by so many to so few", referring to the ongoing efforts of the Royal Air Force and other Allied aircrew who were fighting in the Battle of Britain, the pivotal air battle with the German Luftwaffe.

The speech came amidst German plans for an invasion. At the end of June 1940, the Luftwaffe had a large numerical superiority over the Royal Air Force, with around 2,550 planes compared to the only 750 planes of the RAF. Pilots who fought in the Battle of Britain have been known as "the Few" ever since, at times being specifically commemorated for Battle of Britain Day, on 15 September. The speech has become one of Churchill's most famous, along with "we shall fight on the beaches", "their finest hour", and "blood, toil, tears, and sweat".

Background
Churchill apparently first said the famous sentence to Major General Hastings Ismay after exiting the Battle of Britain Bunker at RAF Uxbridge on 16 August, four days before the speech was given. He had been visiting the No. 11 Group RAF operations room during the day of a battle, where at one point every squadron in the group was engaged while more waves of German planes were crossing the coast. After the fighting had slowed that evening and Churchill and Ismay had departed for Chequers, Churchill said, "Don't speak to me; I have never been so moved." Several minutes later, he told Ismay, "Never in the field of human conflict was so much owed by so many to so few."

The speech was given as the United Kingdom prepared for an impending German invasion. Near the end of June 1940, codebreakers at Bletchley Park deciphered a message containing a request from a Flakcorps unit for detailed maps of the UK, suggesting that the Germans intended to land mobile anti-aircraft guns in Great Britain and Ireland. However, Hitler knew that any invasion attempt would only be successful if the Royal Air Force was weakened or destroyed.

Speech 

Churchill's speech lasted nearly fifty minutes, in which he first remarked that, so far, there had been many fewer casualties than at the same point in the First World War, stating that the war was not a "prodigious slaughter", but instead a "conflict of strategy, of organisation, of technical apparatus, of science, mechanics and morale".

Churchill then spoke about Britain's military preparedness, noting that production of aircraft had increased significantly and would allow the United Kingdom to "continue the air struggle indefinitely and as long as the enemy pleases". He praised British fighter pilots and aircrews, using the phrase that he had first said several days before:

While the speech is most well remembered for its praise of fighter pilots, it also commended bomber crews for their work and urged the public not to forget their actions.

He commented on his government's decision to withdraw its forces from Somaliland the week before, explaining that the British position was untenable due to the French decision to surrender. Churchill also defended the blockade of Germany and its occupied territories, acknowledging that the blockade could cause suffering but laying the blame on the Nazis. He pledged to give food, aid, and relief to occupied countries once they had been "wholly cleared of German forces", helping to lay the groundwork for post-war relief programs.

The final part of the speech was about the destroyers-for-bases deal, in which Britain gave the United States 99-year leases for military bases in the Caribbean and Newfoundland in exchange for fifty American destroyers. No mention was made of the US giving the UK destroyers, and the decision was presented as a goodwill gesture in the interests of mutual security instead of a direct trade of British territories for ships.

Legacy

The speech is well remembered for Churchill's use of the phrase "the few" when referring to Allied aircrew defending the United Kingdom; since then, they have been referred to as "The Few". Nearly 3,000 aircrew from the United Kingdom, the Commonwealth, and other Allied countries took part in the Battle of Britain, a third of which were either killed or wounded. They have been honoured with ceremonies and flypasts on the anniversary of Battle of Britain Day, most recently on the 80th, 75th, and 70th anniversaries.

In 1981, Australian printmaker James Swan changed the quote to "Never was so much owed to so many by so few"
and replaced the airmen's faces by those of Australian politicians he deemed especially blameworthy.

Notes

References

Citations

Bibliography 
 
 
 
 

1940 in politics
1940 in the United Kingdom
1940 speeches
August 1940 events
Battle of Britain
British political phrases
English phrases
Quotations from military
Speeches by Winston Churchill
1940s neologisms
World War II speeches